{{Infobox television
| alt_name = SNL  Live at Five: Sunday Ultimate Party (original working title)
| image = Sunday_Noontime_Live!_title_card.png
 | image_size = 280
| caption = Title card
| camera = Multiple-camera setup
| genre = Musical-variety show
| picture_format = 480i (SDTV)1080i (HDTV)
| location = Studio 72, #72 Kalayaan Ave., Diliman, Quezon City, Metro Manila, Philippines
| runtime = 120 minutes (with commercials)
| creator = Albee Benitez
| developer = Brightlight Productions  Cornerstone Studios
| presenter = Piolo PascualMaja SalvadorCatriona GrayRicci RiveroDonny PangilinanJake Ejercitoand others
| director = Johnny Manahan
| executive_producer = Nancy Yabut  Corrs Ebora-Valenton  Harold Castillo
| producer = Albee Benitez
| company = Brightlight ProductionsCignal EntertainmentCornerstone (CS) Studios
| writer = 
| country = Philippines
| language = Filipino (primary)  English (secondary)
| network = TV5
| first_aired = 
| last_aired = 
| related = P.O.5
| preceded_by = Happy Truck HAPPinas
| followed_by = ASAP Natin 'To
| num_seasons = 1
| num_episodes = 14
}}Sunday Noontime Live! is a Philippine musical variety show broadcast by TV5 which premiered on October 18, 2020. Sunday Noontime Live! was presented by a lineup of ABS-CBN, Star Magic and Cornerstone Entertainment talents led by Piolo Pascual, Maja Salvador, Catriona Gray, Donny Pangilinan, Ricci Rivero and Jake Ejercito.

The program, which aired on the network's Sunday afternoon block at 12 noon preceding I Got You, is produced by Brightlight Productions under producer Albee Benitez in cooperation with Cignal Entertainment, the programming affiliate of TV5 and line produced by Cornerstone Studios. Veteran television director and former Star Magic head Johnny Manahan takes the helm as director, following his longtime stint directing the longest-running Sunday variety show ASAP for over 25 years.Sunday Noontime Live! marks the return of a Sunday musical variety show on TV5 after more than four years since the end of Happy Truck ng Bayan and a decade after the launch of the pioneering P.O.5. However, unlike the other two shows, Sunday Noontime Live! was not produced by TV5 and only aired on the network through a blocktime agreement.

However, after just three months on air, the show, along with Sunday 'Kada aired their final episodes due to low ratings and high production costs. Its timeslot was later filled by a simulcast of ASAP.

History
Following the shutdown and franchise denial of ABS-CBN, it was reported on September 14, 2020 that Piolo Pascual, Catriona Gray and Lani Misalucha are set to host a musical variety show to be directed by Johnny Manahan with a working title of Live at Five: Ultimate Sunday Party, after Brightlight Productions signed a blocktime agreement with TV5.

On September 22, 2020, Maja Salvador revealed that she will be joining the show as one of the main hosts. Contrary to earlier reports, Misalucha was not included in the final cast of the show.

On October 1, 2020, it was revealed that Donny Pangilinan and Jake Ejercito joined the show to complete the main hosts of the program. Also, the show was later retitled to its final title of Sunday Noontime Live!

The show aired its first episode on October 18, 2020. It marked the comeback of having a Sunday musical variety show on TV5 after four years, however, unlike the previous shows, Sunday Noontime Live was not produced by TV5 themselves and aired only through a blocktime agreement between Brightlight Productions and TV5.

On November 15, 2020, the show's second live episode was unable to go live due to technical difficulties, Instead, a replay of the second episode (#SNLAllOverTheWorld) was aired instead. The supposed episode would later be aired on the following week as a pre-taped episode.

On January 3, 2021, Donny Pangilinan left the show. Ricci Rivero would later be promoted to main host to replace him.

However, after three months on air, it was revealed that Sunday Noontime Live! would air its final episode due to a lack of advertisers and sponsorships which resulted to a loss of their budget to pay the blocktime agreement with TV5, despite already having planned its rehearsals, tapings and live episode for its supposed second season. The show aired its last episode on January 17, 2021, being a replay of several past prods from the past few episodes. After the show ended, its vacated timeslot was filled by a simulcast of ASAP.

Eventually, following its end, some of the show's performers and hosts, namely, Donny Pangilinan, KD Estrada, Maris Racal, Sam Mangubat, Fana and Zephanie (later transferred to GMA Network in 2022) have returned to ASAP.

Broadcast
The show aired every Sunday at 12:00 noon Philippine Standard Time until 2:00 PM Philippine Standard Time.

Owing to safety precautions against the COVID-19 pandemic in the Philippines, the show does not admit a live audience. Also, a lock-in taping was entailed to produce a month worth of episodes, with only the episode during the lock-in taping cycle being staged live from Studio 72 itself.

The show aired its final episode on January 17, 2021, being a replay of several prods from the past few episodes, together with Sunday 'Kada. A simulcast of ASAP filled its timeslot.

Cast

Main hosts

 Piolo Pascual (2020-2021) 
 Maja Salvador (2020-2021)
 Catriona Gray (2020-2021)
 Donny Pangilinan (2020-2021)
 Jake Ejercito (2020-2021)
 Ricci Rivero (2021)

Guest Performers

Phase 1

 Beauty Gonzalez
 Bugoy Drilon
 Claire Ruiz
 Daryl Ong
 Dimples Romana
 Fana 
 Jane Oineza
 Jerome Ponce
 Ken San Jose
 Katrina Velarde
 Kokoy de Santos
 Maris Racal
 Niel Murillo
 Ricci Rivero (elevated to main host)
 RK Bagatsing
 Sam Mangubat
 Sassa Dagdag
 SB19 
 The Juans
 This Band
 Zephanie Ashley Colet
 Charles Kieron
 Claudia Barretto
 Janina Vela
 KD Estrada
 Renee Dominique
 Trisha Denise

Phase 3
 Jayda Avanzado 
 Jason Hernandez

Other weeks

 Riva Quenery
 Miguel Odron
 Kris Bernal
 Jay R

Sunday Noontime Live! Band
 Rey Cantong - Musical Director, Guitarist & Vocalist 
 Cookie Taylo - Bass
 Tag-Chariz Duque Cantong - Drums 
 Elijah Glenn De Vera  - Keyboards
 Kaye Cantong - Vocalist

Segments

Asian-Vasion
A segment where various artists perform certain songs that are K-Pop or are used as theme songs for Korean drama series in a dance prod or singing prod.

Ultimate Vocal Showdown
A group composed of Zephanie, Fatima Louise Lagueras a.k.a. Fana, Sassa Dagdag, Sam Mangubat and Niel Murillo of BoybandPH, this segment showcases the 5 aforementioned singers singing the hits of one specific artist.

KantaOke
A segment where the hosts sing a single OPM song, this segment is always the last segment for each episode.

YouHoo
A segment where various artists perform a dance production number.

Jampak
A segment where various Sunday Noontime Live! artists perform the songs of a specific OPM artist/band.

Ratings
According to AGB Nielsen Philippines' Nationwide Urban Television Audience Measurement People in Television Homes, the pilot episode of Sunday Noontime Live!'' earned a 1.2% rating.

Notes

References

External links

TV5 (Philippine TV network) original programming
Philippine music television series
2020 Philippine television series debuts
2021 Philippine television series endings
Filipino-language television shows
Television series by Brightlight Productions
Television series by Cignal Entertainment